General Mirco Zuliani (born 3 February 1953) is an Italian Air Force officer who served as Deputy Supreme Allied Commander Transformation at NATO.

References

Living people
1953 births
Italian Air Force generals
Italian air attachés